Dinara Safina was the defending champion, but lost to Chang Kai-chen in the second round.

Maria Sharapova was the champion, defeating Jelena Janković after Janković retired with a wrist injury with the scoreline at 5–2.

Seeds

The top eight seeds received a bye into the second round.

Draw

Finals

Top half

Section 1

Section 2

Bottom half

Section 3

Section 4

External links
 Main Draw
 Qualifying Draw

References

Singles